Bad Blood is an American drama film, written and directed Michael Yebba. Starring Slaine as Billy Brand, Michael Yebba as Noel Brand, and Evalena Marie as Jill Brand. Produced for Bostown Entertainment by Christophe Petit and Michael Yebba.

Accolades 
2011 Los Angeles Movie Awards – Honorable Mention
2011 Woods Hole Film Festival – Official Selection
2011 Bel-Air Film Festival – Official Selection
2011 Long Island Film Expo – Nominated Best Short Film/Best Director

Cast 
Billy Brand – Slaine
Noel Brand – Michael Yebba
Jill Brand – Evalena Marie

Production
Christophe Petit – Producer
Michael Yebba – Producer

References

External links 
 

2011 films
American drama films
2011 drama films
2010s English-language films
2010s American films